In linear algebra, the quotient of a vector space V by a subspace N is a vector space obtained by "collapsing" N to zero. The space obtained is called a quotient space and is denoted V/N (read "V mod N" or "V by N").

Definition 
Formally, the construction is as follows. Let V be a vector space over a field K, and let N be a subspace of V. We define an equivalence relation ~ on V by stating that x ~ y if . That is, x is related to y if one can be obtained from the other by adding an element of N. From this definition, one can deduce that any element of N is related to the zero vector; more precisely, all the vectors in N get mapped into the equivalence class of the zero vector.

The equivalence class – or, in this case, the coset – of x is often denoted
[x] = x + N 
since it is given by
[x] = {x + n : n ∈ N}.

The quotient space V/N is then defined as V/~, the set of all equivalence classes induced by ~ on V. Scalar multiplication and addition are defined on the equivalence classes by 
α[x] = [αx] for all α ∈ K, and
[x] + [y] = [x + y].
It is not hard to check that these operations are well-defined (i.e. do not depend on the choice of representatives). These operations turn the quotient space V/N into a vector space over K with N being the zero class, [0].

The mapping that associates to  the equivalence class [v] is known as the quotient map.

Examples

Lines in Cartesian Plane

Let  be the standard Cartesian plane, and let Y be a line through the origin in X.  Then the quotient space X/Y can be identified with the space of all lines in X which are parallel to Y.  That is to say that, the elements of the set X/Y are lines in X parallel to Y.  Note that the points along any one such line will satisfy the equivalence relation because their difference vectors belong to Y. This gives a way to visualize quotient spaces geometrically. (By re-parameterising these lines, the quotient space can more conventionally be represented as the space of all points along a line through the origin that is not parallel to Y. Similarly, the quotient space for R3 by a line through the origin can again be represented as the set of all co-parallel lines, or alternatively be represented as the vector space consisting of a plane which only intersects the line at the origin.)

Subspaces of Cartesian Space

Another example is the quotient of Rn by the subspace spanned by the first m standard basis vectors.  The space Rn consists of all n-tuples of real numbers .  The subspace, identified with Rm, consists of all n-tuples such that the last n − m entries are zero: .  Two vectors of Rn are in the same equivalence class modulo the subspace if and only if they are identical in the last n − m coordinates. The quotient space  Rn/Rm is isomorphic to  Rn−m in an obvious manner.

Polynomial Vector Space

Let  be the vector space of all cubic polynomials over the real numbers. Then  is a quotient space, where each element is the set corresponding to polynomials that differ by a quadratic term only.

General Subspaces

More generally, if V is an (internal) direct sum of subspaces U and W,

then the quotient space V/U is naturally isomorphic to W.

Lebesgue Integrals

An important example of a functional quotient space is an Lp space.

Properties 

There is a natural epimorphism from V to the quotient space V/U given by sending x to its equivalence class [x]. The kernel (or nullspace) of this epimorphism is the subspace U. This relationship is neatly summarized by the short exact sequence

If U is a subspace of V, the dimension of V/U is called the codimension of U in V. Since a basis of V may be constructed from a basis A of U and a basis B of V/U by adding a representative of each element of B to A, the dimension of V is the sum of the dimensions of U and V/U. If V is finite-dimensional, it follows that the codimension of U in V is the difference between the dimensions of V and U:

Let T : V → W be a linear operator. The kernel of T, denoted ker(T), is the set of all x in V such that Tx = 0. The kernel is a subspace of V. The first isomorphism theorem for vector spaces says that the quotient space V/ker(T) is isomorphic to the image of V in W. An immediate corollary, for finite-dimensional spaces, is the rank–nullity theorem: the dimension of V is equal to the dimension of the kernel (the nullity of T) plus the dimension of the image (the rank of T).

The cokernel of a linear operator T : V → W is defined to be the quotient space W/im(T).

Quotient of a Banach space by a subspace 
If X is a Banach space and M is a closed subspace of X, then the quotient X/M is again a Banach space. The quotient space is already endowed with a vector space structure by the construction of the previous section. We define a norm on X/M by

When X is complete, then the quotient space X/M is complete with respect to the norm, and therefore a Banach space.

Examples 
Let C[0,1] denote the Banach space of continuous real-valued functions on the interval [0,1] with the sup norm. Denote the subspace of all functions f ∈ C[0,1] with f(0) = 0 by M. Then the equivalence class of some function g is determined by its value at 0, and the quotient space  is isomorphic to R.

If X is a Hilbert space, then the quotient space X/M is isomorphic to the orthogonal complement of M.

Generalization to locally convex spaces 
The quotient of a locally convex space by a closed subspace is again locally convex.  Indeed, suppose that X is locally convex so that the topology on X is generated by a family of seminorms {pα | α ∈ A} where A is an index set.  Let M be a closed subspace, and define seminorms qα on X/M by

Then X/M is a locally convex space, and the topology on it is the quotient topology.

If, furthermore, X is metrizable, then so is X/M.  If X is a Fréchet space, then so is X/M.

See also
 Quotient group
 Quotient module
 Quotient set
 Quotient space (topology)

References

Sources
 

Functional analysis
Linear algebra
Space (linear algebra)